What Happened Then? is a 1934 British crime film directed by Walter Summers and starring Richard Bird, Lorna Hubbard and Geoffrey Wardwell. It was made at Welwyn Studios.

Cast
 Richard Bird as Peter Bromley  
 Lorna Hubbard as Alicia Altherton 
 Geoffrey Wardwell as Raymond Rudford  
 Francis L. Sullivan as Richard Bentley, Prosecution Counsel 
 Richard Gray as Robert  
 George Zucco as Inspector Hull  
 Quentin McPhearson as Kirkland  
 Laurence Hanray as Dr. Bristol  
 Stella Arbenina as Mrs. Bromley  
 Cecil Ramage as Defence  
 J. Fisher White as Judge 
 Alec Finter 
 Kathleen Harrison as a housemaid
 Raymond Huntley as the butler

References

Bibliography
 Low, Rachael. Filmmaking in 1930s Britain. George Allen & Unwin, 1985.
 Wood, Linda. British Films, 1927-1939. British Film Institute, 1986.

External links

1934 films
British crime films
1934 crime films
1930s English-language films
Films shot at Welwyn Studios
Films directed by Walter Summers
British black-and-white films
1930s British films